Mark Rappaport (born January 15, 1942 in New York City, United States) is an American independent/underground film director and film critic, who has been working sporadically since the early 1970s.

Biography
Born and raised in Brighton Beach, New York, Rappaport graduated from Brooklyn College in 1964 with a B.A. in literature. In 2005, he moved to Paris, France, where he resides and works.

In May 2012, Rappaport filed a lawsuit against filmmaker Ray Carney for refusing to return digital masters of his movies which the filmmaker had previously entrusted to Carney to transport to Paris. The suit was later dropped due to rising legal costs, and Rappaport started an online petition demanding that Carney return the masters.

Film career
Starting in 1966, Rappaport directed two short films and six low-budget features, most notably the Max Ophuls-influenced The Scenic Route (1978), Impostors (1979), and Chain Letters (1985).

In 1992, he directed Rock Hudson's Home Movies, a documentary on Rock Hudson's homosexuality as seen through clips from his films. The same form was used for From the Journals of Jean Seberg (1995) and The Silver Screen : Color Me Lavender (1997) hosted by Dan Butler. Because of this work, critic Matt Zoller Seitz called Rappaport "the father of the modern video essay."

Starting in 2014, Rappaport turned to short video essays on film history, notably chronicling the careers of actors (Anita Ekberg, Marcel Dalio, Debra Paget, Chris Olsen, Conrad Veidt, Will Geer) and specific directors (Douglas Sirk, Max Ophuls, Sergei Eisenstein, Jacques Tati and Robert Bresson).

Writing career
In 1994, Rappaport started contributing to French film journal Trafic, created by Serge Daney two years earlier. Since then, he published more than 40 pieces, and several collections, including Le spectateur qui en savait trop (2008, in French) and (F)au(x)tobiographies (2013).

Recognition
Rappaport has been noted by Roger Ebert, Jonathan Rosenbaum, Ray Carney, J. Hoberman, Dave Kehr, and Stuart Klawans. Ray Carney considers him the greatest contemporary American film director.

Filmography

References

External links
 

Living people
American film directors
American film critics
Brooklyn College alumni
American experimental filmmakers
1942 births
Collage filmmakers